Vice Admiral Vladimir Alexeyevich Kornilov (13 February 1806 – 17 October 1854) was a Russian naval officer who took part in the Crimean War and is known for his battle against the Pervaz-ı Bahrî in what is considered the first battle between steam ships.

Biography

Early Life and Career 
Kornilov was born on his family estate in Staritsky District, Tver Governorate in 1806. His father was governor of Irkutsk. Kornilov entered the naval service in 1823, and in 1827 he fought in the Battle of Navarino as a midshipman aboard the fleet's flagship .

In 1841 he became the first captain of the battleship Twelve Apostles, he disciplined the crew and participated with it in the Black Sea Fleet Review (held every seven years) before Grand Duke Konstantin Nikolayevich. He sailed to London in 1847 to buy a new steam frigate. In 1849 he became chief of staff Black Sea Fleet.

Crimean War

Battle against the Pervaz-ı Bahrî 
The Russian Black Fleet was split into two squadrons. One of which went to Kornilov and the other to Pavel Nakhimov. Alexander Sergeyevich Menshikov tasked Kornilov to attack any Ottoman ship. He then patrol the Black Sea. After this patrol he sent most of his squadron back on Sevastopol. With himself staying in the Vladimir.

On November 17th 1853, with his flag hoisted aboard the 11-gun steam frigate Vladimir (commanded by Lieutenant-Commander Grigory I. Butakov) met a 19-gun Turkish vessel, Pervaz-ı Bahrî, when they were cruising close to Penderakli. Kornilov gave the order of engaging the enemy and Vladimir joined battle against Pervaz-Bahri. The Ottoman ship had no bow and stern artillery, so every time it employed its side artillery, Butakov manoeuvred to rake its stern. Considering that the battle was taking too long, Kornilov gave the order to speed the sinking of the enemy. Cpt. Pervaz-Bahri had suffered heavy casualties in the three-hour-long battle and hauled its flag. The ship was transported to Sevastopol where it was commissioned into the Russian Navy as Kornilov. The battle resulted in 22 dead Ottoman Sailors, including the commander Said Pasha and another 18 wounded. Meanwhile, the Russians had two dead, and two others were injured.

Rest of the War 
Sometime after the Battle against the Pervaz-Bahri, Kornilov was sent as reinforcement for Nakhimov's squadron. Kornilov arrived around the end of the Battle of Sinop, where he chased the Ottoman frigate Taif after it departed for Istanbul. However, the frigate got away. 

During the Crimean War, Kornilov was responsible for the defence of Sevastopol. He was killed early in the siege and was buried in the Admirals' Burial Vault.

Legacy 
In the 1890s a statue of Kornilov alongside Pavel Nakhimov was put up in Sevastopol.

See also
Pavel Nakhimov
Vladimir Istomin
Mikhail Lazarev

References

1806 births
1854 deaths
People from Staritsky District
People from Tver Governorate
Imperial Russian Navy admirals
Russian military personnel killed in the Crimean War